Milnes Island is an island lying  north of Woolpack Island, in the Biscoe Islands of Antarctica. It was charted by the British Graham Land Expedition under John Rymill, 1934–37, and was named by the UK Antarctic Place-Names Committee in 1959 for Leading Seaman Arthur R. Milnes, Royal Navy, a member of the British Naval Hydrographic Survey Units in the area in 1956–57 and 1957–58.

See also 
 List of Antarctic and sub-Antarctic islands

References

Islands of the Biscoe Islands